Park Slope Historic District is a national historic district in Park Slope, Brooklyn, New York, New York.  It consists of 1,802 contributing buildings built between 1862 and about 1920.  The 40-block district is almost exclusively residential and located adjacent to Prospect Park.  It includes a variety of two and three story townhouses built in a variety of popular architectural styles of the late-19th and early 20th centuries. It was listed on the National Register of Historic Places in 1980.

The national historic district is overlaid by another district, designated by the New York City Landmarks Preservation Commission in 1973. The city district was expanded in 2012 to cover 2,575 buildings stretching over part or all of around 40 city blocks, and again to the north in 2016. The historic district is New York's largest landmarked neighborhood in terms of the number of buildings.

Gallery

See also 

 115-119 Eighth Avenue (Brooklyn), also known as Adams House, a notable building within the district

References

Park Slope
1862 establishments in New York (state)
Historic districts on the National Register of Historic Places in Brooklyn
New York City designated historic districts
New York City Designated Landmarks in Brooklyn